Austin Sperry (born 11 May 1978 in Oakland, California) is an American sailor and together with John Dane III was the winner of the 2007 U.S. Olympic Trials, securing their place in Sailing at the 2008 Summer Olympics – Star class.  Sperry is coached by Hans Wallen (Star Silver, Sweden '96), Steve Erickson (Star Gold, USA '84) and Rodney Hagebols.

References

External links
Austin Sperry's Official Website

1978 births
Living people
Olympic sailors of the United States
American male sailors (sport)
Sailors at the 2008 Summer Olympics – Star